Year 826 (DCCCXXVI) was a common year starting on Monday (link will display the full calendar) of the Julian calendar, the 826th year of the Common Era (CE) and Anno Domini (AD) designations, the 826th year of the 1st millennium, the 26th year of the 9th century, and the 7th year of the 820s decade.

Events 
 By place 
 Britain 
 King Beornwulf of Mercia invades East Anglia, but is killed in battle. He is succeeded by Ludeca, as ruler of Mercia.
 Prince Aethelwulf, a son of King Egbert of Wessex, invades Kent, and drives out its pro-Mercian king Baldred.

 Byzantine Empire  
 May – Euphemius, Byzantine admiral, organises an uprising in Sicily against Emperor Michael II. He proclaims himself Emperor (with the title of basileus) in Syracuse, independent from Constantinople. In turn, Euphemius is defeated by Byzantine troops (reinforcements from the East), and is driven out to North Africa.

 Europe 
 King Harald Klak of Denmark receives the Frisian county of Rüstringen, as a gift from Emperor Louis the Pious.

 By topic 

 Religion 
 Harald Klak accepts Christianity, and is baptized with his wife and son Godfrid at Mainz.

Births 
 January 22 – Montuku, emperor of Japan (d. 858)
 November 29 – William of Septimania, Frankish nobleman (d. 850)
 Al-Mubarrad, Muslim grammarian (d. 898)
 Ansgarde of Burgundy, Frankish queen (approximate date)
 Cyril, Byzantine missionary and bishop (d. 885)
 Doseon, Korean Buddhist monk (d. 898)
 Thābit ibn Qurra, Muslim astronomer and physician (d. 901)

Deaths 
 Ashot I, prince of Iberia (or 830)
 Ashot Msaker, prince of Armenia
 Bai Xingjian, Chinese poet and writer (b. 776)
 Beornwulf, king of Mercia
 Fujiwara no Fuyutsugu, Japanese general (b. 775)
 Heondeok, king of Silla (Korea)
 Li Guangyan, Chinese general (b. 761)
 Li Wu, prince of the Tang Dynasty
 Theodore the Studite, Byzantine abbot (b. 759)
 Wu Yantong, Chinese Buddhist monk 
 Zhu Kerong, Chinese governor (jiedushi)

References